Dmytro Kozachenko (born 11 January 1982) is a Ukrainian professional football goalkeeper who plays for Nasaf Qarshi in the Uzbek League. He previously played for FC Obolon Kyiv, FC Nafkom Brovary and FC Zorya Luhansk in Ukraine and FC Atyrau in Kazakhstan.

External links
 
 
 
 Profile at AVR-Sport 

1982 births
Living people
Ukrainian footballers
Ukrainian expatriate footballers
Expatriate footballers in Italy
Expatriate footballers in Kazakhstan
Expatriate footballers in Uzbekistan
FC Nafkom Brovary players
FC Zorya Luhansk players
Association football goalkeepers